Schaefferia is a genus of springtails in the family Hypogastruridae. There are at least 20 described species in Schaefferia.

Species
These 28 species belong to the genus Schaefferia:

 Schaefferia ariegica Cassagnau, 1959 i c g
 Schaefferia baschkirica Kniss, 1985 i c g
 Schaefferia bidentata (Cassagnau, 1954) i c g
 Schaefferia canigouensis Deharveng & Thibaud, 1980 i c g
 Schaefferia cassagnaui Salmon, 1964 i c g
 Schaefferia coeca Cassagnau, 1959 i c g
 Schaefferia decemoculata (Stach, 1939) i c g
 Schaefferia deharvengi (Jordana & Arbea, 1990) i c g
 Schaefferia duodecimocellata Bonet, 1945 i c g b
 Schaefferia duodecimoculata (Steiner, 1955) i c g
 Schaefferia elegans (Cassagnau, 1959) g
 Schaefferia emucronata Absolon, 1900 i c g
 Schaefferia fukugakuchiana (Yosii, 1956) i c g
 Schaefferia guerrerensis (Bonet, 1945) i c g
 Schaefferia hubbardi Thibaud, 1995 i c g
 Schaefferia jarae (Jordana & Arbea, 1990) i c g
 Schaefferia kitakamiana Yosii, 1991 i c g
 Schaefferia lindbergi da Gama, 1963 i c g
 Schaefferia maxima Deharveng & Thibaud, 1980 i c g
 Schaefferia oaxacana Palacios-Vargas & Thibaud, 1985 i g
 Schaefferia oculea Babenko, 1999 i c g
 Schaefferia pouadensis Delamare Deboutteville, 1945 i c g
 Schaefferia quadrioculata (Stach, 1939) i c g
 Schaefferia quinqueoculata (Yosii, 1956) i c g
 Schaefferia scossirolii Dallai & Sabatini, 1981 i c g
 Schaefferia sexoculata (Gisin, 1947) i c g
 Schaefferia subcoeca Deharveng & Thibaud, 1980 i c g
 Schaefferia willemi (Bonet, 1930) i c g

Data sources: i = ITIS, c = Catalogue of Life, g = GBIF, b = Bugguide.net

References

Further reading

 
 
 

Collembola
Springtail genera
Taxa named by Karel Absolon